Distort Entertainment is a Canadian independent record label based in Toronto, Ontario. The label specializes in bands performing hardcore punk-derived music, including Alexisonfire, Cancer Bats and Johnny Truant, but its sister division Distort Light has also released less aggressive rock bands such as Bend Sinister.

History
Formed by Greg Below, (concert promoter and owner of Distort Productions) and Mitch Joel, (music journalist and publicist) in early 2002, Distort began by producing New Jersey's Step Kings' third release, 3 The Hard Way. The label's slogan "Listen Harder" was soon formed and showed Distort's specialization in heavy music.

In 2002, Below's full-time employment as a studio manager with EMI publishing Canada later helped to jump start Distort by opening the door to a distribution partnership with EMI Music Canada. Although Distort is admired for its independence in the industry, it wanted to be associated with the well respected quality for which EMI had become known.

Now quite established, Distort Entertainment is a well-known Canadian label, and back some of the most respected bands in the heavy music industry.

Artists/bands represented
A Textbook Tragedy
Alexisonfire
Architects
A Sight For Sewn Eyes
Blackstorm
Bend Sinister
The Bled
Bleeding Through
The Bronx
Bury Tomorrow - Canadian Distribution
Cancer Bats
Cavorts
Comeback Kid
Dead and Divine
Damn 13
Exalt
The End
The Gorgeous
Johnny Truant
Lower Than Atlantis
Mandroid Echostar
Northlane
Oceana
Periphery
Savannah
Shaped by Fate
Sights And Sounds
Sleep When You're Dead
Straight Reads The Line

See also

 List of record labels

References

External links 
 Official Distort Webpage 
 Official Myspace site

Record labels established in 2002
Canadian independent record labels
Heavy metal record labels
Hardcore record labels
2002 establishments in Ontario